USS Whitney (AD-4) was a Dobbin-class destroyer tender named for United States Secretary of the Navy William Collins Whitney. She was launched on 12 October 1923, and was commissioned on 2 September 1924. She was decommissioned on 22 October 1946, later being sold for scrap to the Dulien Ship Products firm on 18 March 1948. Whitney was undamaged during the attack.

Dallas police detective Jim Leavelle, who became renowned for escorting Lee Harvey Oswald when Oswald was shot by Jack Ruby, served aboard the Whitney  and was on board during the attack on Pearl Harbor.

Machinist Mate 1st Class Ernest L. Quetschke served on Whitney from the onset of WWII to the end of WWII. "Ernie" doubled as a 6-pounder Hotchkiss gunner for his on-deck duties.  Ernest Quetschke returned home to his hometown of Toledo, Ohio after the war ended.

References

External links
 DANFS entry on USS Whitney

1923 ships
Dobbin-class destroyer tenders
Ships present during the attack on Pearl Harbor
Tenders of the United States Navy
Destroyer tenders of the United States